Gilles Frechingues (born 1 September 1971) is a French former professional footballer who played as a defender.

References

1971 births
Living people
French footballers
FC Martigues players
Gazélec Ajaccio players
FC Sète 34 players
Association football defenders
Ligue 1 players
Footballers from Marseille
SC Toulon players